The Cross of Justin II (also known as Crux Vaticana, Latin for "Vatican Cross") is a processional cross dating from the sixth century that is kept in the Treasury in St. Peter's Basilica, in Vatican City. It is also one of the oldest surviving claimed reliquaries of the True Cross, if not the oldest. It is a crux gemmata or jewelled cross, silver-gilt and adorned with jewels in gold settings, given to the people of Rome by the Emperor of the Eastern Roman (Byzantine) Empire, Justin II, who reigned from 565 to 578 in Constantinople, and his co-ruler and wife, the Empress Sophia. 

The cross bears a Latin inscription reading: ligno quo Christus humanum subdidit hostem dat Romae Iustinus opem et socia decorem which is commonly mistranslated as "For the wood [of the cross] with which human Christ was overcome by the enemy, Justin [and his consort?] give Rome this wealth and decoration"  A more accurate reading is: "With the wood with which Christ conquered man's enemy, Justin gives his help to Rome and his wife offers the ornamentation."  To mark the end of restoration and conservation work on the cross, it was placed on display in the main Basilica of Saint Peter's from November 2009 to April 12, 2010.

Description
 
The original portion of the cross, which is now mounted on a much later stand, is 15.75 inches high and 11.81 inches wide, excluding the spike at the bottom for fitting into its stand.  The cross was restored in 2009; it has been altered and restored at several points in its history, including reducing its size.

The front of the cross has no figurative images: in the centre is a medallion containing the relic, which is itself displayed as cross-shaped.  The centres of the arms carry the inscriptions, and the edges of the arms jewels in set in gold, with four jewels hanging from the arms as pendilia.  The reverse side is decorated in repoussé silver, and shows an interesting transitional stage in the decoration of the cross.  At the period the church was starting to encourage representation of the human figure of Christ on the cross, making a crucifix, which had previously not been usual.  The central medallion shows the Lamb of God, a common older formula.  Above and below this are images in medallions of Christ (the lower one may be John the Baptist instead).  The upper one shows Christ holding a book, representing the Gospels, which was to become a standard feature of the image of Christ Pantocrator; in the lower one Christ or John has a blessing gesture.  At the ends of the arms, where the Virgin Mary and Saint John the Evangelist would often be found in later crucifixes, are instead portraits in medallions of Justin and his empress Sophia.    Between the medallions there are decorative foliage scrolling motifs, on the upright centred on onion-like plants probably intended as palm-trees.

Date
In 569, Justin and Sophia together reportedly sent a relic of the True Cross to the Frankish princess Radegund, who founded a monastery at Poitiers to house it. The event was commemorated in Vexilla Regis by Venantius Fortunatus. They are also recorded as sending relics to Pope John III (reigned 561–574) in an attempt to improve relations – the Crux Vaticana very likely dates from John's reign, perhaps around 568 or 569.   Older scholars thought, mainly on the basis of imperial head-dress, that Justin I (r. 518–27) and his empress Euphemia were the donors, but this view seems now rejected.

Notes

References
 McClanan, Anne L., Representations of early Byzantine empresses: image and empire, Palgrave Macmillan, 2002, google books
 Cotsonis, John, Byzantine Figural Processional Crosses, Washington: Dumbarton Oaks Research Library and Collection, 1994,  good image of reverse, p. 58
 Vatican Museums - web page (non official website), accessed January 30, 2010
 Vatican press release, via Associated Press, November 19, 2009, accessed February 5, 2010.
 Sante Guido, La Crux Vaticana o Croce di Giustino II, Città del Vaticano, Edizioni Capitolo Vaticano, 2009.

External links
 High resolution picture of the Cross of Justin II

Reliquaries of the True Cross
Crux gemmata
Byzantine art
Medieval European metalwork objects
Processional crosses
Reliquary crosses